Bornerbroek is a church village in the municipality of Almelo in Twente, the Dutch province of Overijssel. Up to the municipal reorganisation of 1 January 2001, the village was part of the municipality of Borne.

History
The village was first mentioned in 1475 as Bornerbroeck, and means "swampy land near Borne". The suffix -broek in the village name is a reference to a marsh in the vicinity of the village.

In the late Middle Ages, Bornerbroek was the name of a group of farms. According to tradition, the village was originally meant to be located more in the vicinity of Almelo, but during transport, the axis of the vehicle transporting the building materials for the new church (the first St. Stephen's church) broke, leading to the decision to build the church at that spot.

Bornerbroek was home to 570 people in 1840. The current St Stephen's church was built in 1857. It has a tower with a constricted spire.

References 

Populated places in Overijssel
Almelo